A Centauri is a single star in the southern constellation of Centaurus. It is blue-white in hue and is faintly visible to the naked eye with an apparent visual magnitude of +4.62. The star is located at a distance of approximately 430 light-years from the Sun based on stellar parallax. It appears to be drifting further away with a radial velocity of around +6 km/s.

This is a rapidly rotating Be star, showing an emission-line spectrum on top of the normal absorption spectrum of the star, due to a  circumstellar disk of ejected matter. It doesn't show any absorption lines from the disk. It is a B-type main-sequence star with a stellar classification of B9V.

References

External links 
Wikisky image of HD 100673 (A Centauri)

B-type main-sequence stars
Be stars
Centaurus (constellation)
Centauri, A
PD-53 4637
100673
056480
4460